With Time to Kill is a 1987 Australian film directed by James Clayden. It screened at the 1987 Melbourne International Film Festival.

References

External links
With Time to Kill at Oz Movies

With Time to Kill at Screen Australia

1987 films
Australian crime drama films
1980s English-language films
1980s Australian films